Antoine (4 June 148914 June 1544), known as the Good, was Duke of Lorraine from 1508 until his death in 1544. Raised at the French court, Antoine would campaign in Italy twice: once under Louis XII and the other with Francis I. During the German Peasants' War, he would defeat two armies while retaking Saverne and Sélestat. Antoine succeeded in freeing Lorraine from the Holy Roman Empire with the Treaty of Nuremberg of 1542. In 1544, while Antoine suffered from an illness, the Duchy of Lorraine was invaded by Emperor Charles V's army on their way to attack France. Fleeing the Imperial armies, Antoine was taken to Bar-le-Duc where he died.

Biography
Antoine was born, 4 June 1489, at Bar-le-Duc, the son of René II, Duke of Lorraine and Philippa of Guelders. He spent seven years at the court of King Louis XII together with his brother Claude, and became friends with the Duke of Angoulême, the future King Francis I. After the death of his father, Antoine succeeded him as duke of Lorraine in December 1508. In 1530, a transaction between Antoine and his brother, divided the family possessions, with Antoine getting the duchies of Lorraine and Bar while Claude would receive the duchy of Guise.

In 1509 he entrusted the reins of the Duchy to his mother and Hugues des Hazards, bishop of Toul, and followed Louis XII in his campaign in northern Italy, where he took part in the Battle of Agnadello of that year. After Louis' death, he went back to Italy and under Francis I, participating in the battle of Marignano (13–14 September 1515). However, called back home by problems in Lorraine, he was absent at the decisive battle of Pavia (1525), in which Francis was taken prisoner and his brother François, count of Lambesc, was killed.

Peasant war
In Lorraine, Antoine had to face the spreading of Protestant Reformation, against which he published an edict on 26 December 1523. The situation worsened the following year, when a rebellion, known as German Peasants' War, broke out in Alsace. The insurrectionists captured Saverne and tried to conquer Saint-Dié, while the peasants of Bitscherland also rebelled in May 1525. Antoine launched an expedition in which he massacred a peasant army at Saverne on 16 May and on 20 May he decisively defeated another peasant army near Sélestat.

Duchy legal status
Despite remaining neutral in the wars between France and the Holy Roman Empire, Antoine sent his son Francis to the French court and by 1527 was attempting to marry him to Anne of Cleves. In an effort to improve his relations with German lords, Antoine sent a few hundred soldiers to fight against the Ottomans at the Siege of Vienna in 1529. Antoine dispatched legal envoys to the Imperial diet, in 1532, seeking clarification of the duchy of Lorraine's legal status within the Holy Roman Empire to no avail.

In 1538, Antoine claimed the titles of Duke of Guelders and Count of Zutphen upon the death of Charles of Egmond, but was unable to gain possession of them. He married his heir, Francis to Christina of Denmark, niece of Charles V, in 1541, and with the Treaty of Nuremberg (26 August 1542), Antoine obtained from Charles V the independence of the Duchy of Lorraine. He interceded at the start of Francis and Charles' war in 1542 as a peace envoy, visiting Charles in person, but due to gout sent his heir to Francis. In fact, Antoine asked his niece, Mary of Guise, to send him a Scottish hackney horse which he hoped would be easier to ride with his gout.

Death and aftermath
In May 1544, Charles V's army marched into Lorraine as part of a plan to invade France, while Henry VIII of England attacked northern France from Calais. Weakened by an illness, Antoine was unable to respond, and was taken to Bar-le-Duc where he died on 14 June 1544.

Antoine's oldest son Francis succeeded him as Duke of Lorraine and ruled for only one year, dying in 1545. His son, Antoine's grandson, Charles III of Lorraine became duke with his mother, Christina of Denmark, as regent. By 1552, King Henry II of France visited Charles and it was decided that Charles would be educated at the French court and that the regency of Lorraine would fall to his uncle, Nicolas, Duke of Mercœur. In 1559, the House of Guise, fearing the influence of the Holy Roman Empire over Lorraine, orchestrated Charles's marriage to Claude of France, daughter of Henry II of France and Catherine de' Medici.

Family
On 26 June 1515, he married Renée of Bourbon, daughter of Gilbert de Bourbon, Count of Montpensier and Clara Gonzaga.

They had:

 Francis I, Duke of Lorraine (1517–1545), married Christina of Denmark
 Nicholas, Duke of Mercœur (1524–1577)
 Anna (1522–1568), married firstly René of Châlon, Prince of Orange, and secondly Philip II, Duke of Aerschot (1496–1549)

See also

 Dukes of Lorraine family tree

References

Sources

|-

1489 births
1544 deaths
People from Bar-le-Duc
House of Lorraine
Dukes of Lorraine
Dukes of Bar
Marquesses of Pont-à-Mousson
Hereditary Princes of Lorraine